Sternfeld is a surname. Notable people with the surname include:

 Aenne Biermann, née Sternfeld (1898–1933), German photographer
 Ary Abramovich Sternfeld (1905–1980), Polish aerospace scientist
 Daniel Sternfeld (1905–1986), Belgian Composer
 Joel Sternfeld (born 1944), American photographer
 Nathan Sternfeld, author of Adventures With Rebbe Mendel
 Richard Sternfeld (1884–1943), German herpetologist

See also
 Sternfeld (crater), a lunar impact crater